The North Aegean Region is one of the thirteen administrative regions of Greece, and the smallest of the thirteen by population. It comprises the islands of the north-eastern Aegean Sea, called the North Aegean islands, except for Thasos and Samothrace, which belong to the Greek region of Eastern Macedonia and Thrace, and Imbros and Tenedos, which belong to Turkey.

Administration 
The North Aegean region was established in the 1987 administrative reform. With the 2010 Kallikratis plan, its powers and authority were redefined and extended. Along with the Southern Aegean region, it is supervised by the Decentralized Administration of the Aegean based at Piraeus. The capital of the region is situated in Mytilene on the island of Lesbos.

Until the Kallikratis reform, the region consisted of the three prefectures of Samos, Chios and Lesbos. Since 1 January 2011 it is divided into five regional units: Chios, Ikaria, Lemnos, Lesbos and Samos. The total number of islands in the North Aegean region are nine: Lesbos, Chios, Psara, Oinousses, Ikaria, Fournoi Korseon, Lemnos,  Agios Efstratios and Samos.

Major communities
Chíos (Χίος)
Kalloní (Καλλονή)
Karlóvasi (Καρλόβασι)
Mýrina (Μύρινα)
Mytilíni (Μυτιλήνη)
Omiroúpoli (Ομηρούπολη)
Pythagóreio (Πυθαγόρειο)
Vathý (Βαθύ)

Demographics
The region has shrunk by 5,095 people between 2011 and 2021, experiencing a population loss of 2.6%.

Economy 
The Gross domestic product (GDP) of the region was 2.5 billion € in 2018, accounting for 1.4% of Greek economic output. GDP per capita adjusted for purchasing power was 14,200 € or 47% of the EU27 average in the same year. The GDP per employee was 67% of the EU average. North Aegean is the region in Greece with the lowest GDP per capita and one of the poorest regions in the EU.

References

External links

  

 
NUTS 2 statistical regions of the European Union
States and territories established in 1987
Administrative regions of Greece
1987 establishments in Greece